Guillaume Warmuz (born 22 May 1970) is a French football coach and former player who played as a goalkeeper.

He played 374 games in Ligue 1 during 13 seasons, representing in the competition Lens and Monaco.

Playing career
Born in Saint-Vallier, Saône-et-Loire, Warmuz started his professional with Olympique de Marseille in 1989. After no Ligue 1 appearances in his sole season he moved to CS Louhans-Cuiseaux from Ligue 2, where he was first-choice.

In the 1992 summer Warmuz signed for top flight club RC Lens, making his club debut on 8 August in a 3–0 home defeat by AJ Auxerre. Over the course of the following ten years he went on to play in 427 official games for Les Sang et Or, winning the 1998 national championship and the following year's Coupe de la Ligue.

In January 2003, then a free agent Warmuz signed a short-term contract for Arsenal, as a replacement for the injured Rami Shaaban. He left in July after failing to appear in any matches, and joined Borussia Dortmund after Jens Lehmann had just left for the Gunners.

Warmuz featured in 17 Bundesliga matches in his first season, as the other goalkeeper Roman Weidenfeller did the same and the club finished in sixth position. He left in 2005 to AS Monaco FC back in his country, retiring at the end of the 2006–07 campaign at the age of 37.

Managerial career
On 16 February 2008, Warmuz was appointed director of football at FC Gueugnon, lasting eight days in office. From May to December 2012, he acted as Auxerre's goalkeeping coach.

On 1 June 2017, Warmuz was appointed as manager of Championnat National 2 side Montceau Bourgogne. In April 2018, with his side facing relegation, Warmuz resigned as manager.

Honours
Lens
 French Division 1: 1997–98
 Coupe de la Ligue: 1998–99

References

External links
 Official website 
 Racing Lens archives 
 
 
 
 

1970 births
Living people
French footballers
Association football goalkeepers
France under-21 international footballers
Ligue 1 players
Ligue 2 players
Bundesliga players
Olympique de Marseille players
Louhans-Cuiseaux FC players
RC Lens players
Arsenal F.C. players
Borussia Dortmund players
Borussia Dortmund II players
AS Monaco FC players
French expatriate footballers
French expatriate sportspeople in England
Expatriate footballers in England
French expatriate sportspeople in Germany
Expatriate footballers in Germany
Sportspeople from Saône-et-Loire
Footballers from Bourgogne-Franche-Comté